Kingwell Court Preparatory School was a British boarding school for boys.

The school was located in a remodelled Tudor home near Bradford-on-Avon, Wiltshire and prepared boys for the Common Entrance Exam to enter a British Public School. It was founded by Mr Sydney Allen, originally as Kingwell Hall at Timsbury. In the 1930s it moved to Bradford-on-Avon. At the death of Mr Allen, at the beginning of the war, it was amalgamated with Kilvington Hall, a prep school situated in Enfield Chase and which had to be evacuated because of enemy action. This school had two head-masters, Messrs K.V. Beech and W. Bennett. Mr Beech ran Kingwell during WWII while Mr. Bennett served as an officer in the British Army. The school crest was an elephant; the motto: "Be strong, gently". School was divided into 4 sets: Lions, Tigers, Leopards and Bears.

There were two mistresses and about six resident masters, plus the two head masters and a retired nurse acting as the Matron and her assistant. The piano teacher, Mr Hathaway, lived in town and came to school on two afternoons a week to offer private lessons for an extra fee, after regular classes were dismissed. He also conducted singing lessons for the whole school. Evening prep was for one hour, devoting 20 minutes to each of three regularly scheduled subjects. Classes were held Monday through Saturday morning and all afternoons except on Wednesdays and Saturdays.

Kingwell Court School merged with The Old Ride School, which moved from its original home at Little Horwood, Buckinghamshire, in 1959. Boys from The Old Ride joined the Kingwell Court boys in a combined school, renamed "The Old Ride" in the winter term of 1959.

For a while the two sets of boys were easily distinguished by the fact that they retained their school uniforms - red for The Old Ride and purple for Kingwell Court.  Eventually the purple phased out. When the two schools merged, the previous Kingwell Court division into four sets of boys (Lions, Tigers, Leopards and Bears) became the four Nations of Britons, Spartans, Trojans and Vikings, a continuation of the arrangement at the "old" Old Ride school.  The Nations competed for the coveted weekly "Owl" trophy.

The school closed down in 1990.

Boys' schools in Wiltshire
Boarding schools in Wiltshire
Defunct schools in Wiltshire
Educational institutions disestablished in 1990
1990 disestablishments in England
Defunct boarding schools in England